Zhang Yiyao (born 13 March 2002) is a Chinese artistic swimmer. At the 2022 World Aquatics Championships, she won a bronze medal in the mixed duet technical routine and a bronze medal in the mixed duet free routine. In 2018, she won two silver medals in mixed duet events at the World Junior Championships and four gold medals, two in mixed duet events and two in team events, at the leg of the 2018 Artistic Swimming World Series held in Beijing.

Background
Yiyao was born 13 March 2002 in China.

Career

2018
At the second leg of the 2018 FINA Artistic Swimming World Series, held in Beijing in April, Yiyao won two gold medals in team events, the team technical routine and the team free routine, contributing in a reserve role for each event. In the mixed duet technical routine, she and her partner Shi Haoyu won the gold medal with a score of 76.9274 points. They followed up their performance with another gold medal, this time in the mixed duet free routine with a score of 77.8667 points. Later in the year, in July at the 2018 World Junior Artistic Swimming Championships in Budapest, Hungary, she won silver medals in the mixed duet technical routine, with a score of 79.3538 points, and the mixed duet free routine, with a score of 81.4667 points, competing with partner Shi Haoyu in both events.

2022 World Aquatics Championships

In the preliminaries of the mixed duet technical routine at the 2022 World Aquatics Championships, held in Budapest, Hungary with artistic swimming contested in June, Yiyao and her partner Shi Haoyu scored 84.8232 points, advancing to the final ranking third. For their performance in the final two days later, the duo scored 86.4425 points and won the bronze medal behind gold medalists Giorgio Minisini and Lucrezia Ruggiero of Italy and silver medalists Yotaro Sato and Tomoka Sato of Japan. In the preliminaries of the mixed duet free routine four days later, the duo qualified for the final with an overall third-rank and score of 87.8333 points. Improving their score to 88.4000 points in the final with choreography to music by Chinese musical artist Yang Bingyin with a "Swordsmen" theme, they won the bronze medal.

International championships

Artistic Swimming World Series circuits
The following medals Yiyao has won at Artistic Swimming World Series circuits.

See also
 China at the 2022 World Aquatics Championships

References

External links
 

2002 births
Living people
Chinese synchronized swimmers
World Aquatics Championships medalists in synchronised swimming
Artistic swimmers at the 2022 World Aquatics Championships